Maria Arredondo is the first album by  Norwegian singer Maria Arredondo, released in Norway on March 17, 2003, with a second edition released on June 30, 2003. The album was the most successful album by Arredondo either in critics or sales. It has 12 songs with the second edition and 5 singles were released. One of the singles, "In Love With An Angel", a duet with Christian Ingebrigtsen, was nominated for the 2003 Norwegian Grammy Awards as 'Song Of The Year'.

History 
After two years recording the songs, Arredondo signed with Universal Music Norway. The album entered the Norwegian Top 40 and Norwegian Topp 30 Norsk at #2 and spent 23 weeks on the charts. It was recorded in Sweden and Norway, and was produced by several well-known Scandinavian producers such as Jonas von Der Burg, Espen Lind, Bluefish, Jonny Sjo, Harry Sommerdahl and Bjørn Erik Pedersen. Several successful songwriters also contributed, including Christian Ingebrigtsen, Jonas von Der Burg, Silje Nergaard, Espen Lind and Harry Sommerdahl. The first single released was "Can Let Go". The second single, "Just A Little Heartache" was very successful in the radio charts. "In Love With An Angel" was the third single and became the first and only #1 single for Arredondo.

The album was re-released with a new song, "Hardly Hurts At All", which was released as a single. The last single from the album was "A Thousand Nights". The album went platinum and sold more than 70,000 copies.

Track listing

Charts

Album

Singles

References 

2003 debut albums
Maria Arredondo albums
Universal Music Norway albums